The Exile of Bar-K Ranch is a 1915 American short silent Western film directed by  B. Reeves Eason.

Cast
 Jack Richardson
 Charles Newton
 Walter Spencer
 Louise Lester
 Jimsy Maye
 Vivian Rich
 Roy Stewart

References

External links
 

1915 films
1915 Western (genre) films
1915 short films
American silent short films
American black-and-white films
Films directed by B. Reeves Eason
Silent American Western (genre) films
1910s American films
1910s English-language films